Copanlisib (trade name Aliqopa  ; codenamed BAY 80-6946) is a drug which is approved by US FDA for the treatment of adult patients experiencing relapsed follicular lymphoma who have received at least two prior systemic therapies.
	
Copanlisib has been shown to have an effect against survival and spread of cancerous B-cells.

Efficacy resulting in the approval of copanlisib was based on the subgroup of 104 patients with follicular lymphoma from a Phase 2 clinical trial. Of these, 59 percent had a complete or partial shrinkage of their tumors that lasted about 12 months.
To assess the safety of the drug, data from 168 adults with follicular lymphoma and other hematologic malignancies treated with copanlisib were evaluated.

Copanlisib is administered as intravenous infusion on a weekly but intermittent schedule (three weeks on and one week off).

Copanlisib is currently approved only in the United States.

Adverse effects
Data for safety and efficacy of copanlisib are described in the consumer-targeted FDA Drug Trial Snapshot. Copanlisib can cause serious side effects including infections, hyperglycemia, hypertension, pneumonitis, neutropenia and skin rashes. The most common side effects of copanlisib are hyperglycemia, diarrhea, decreased general strength and energy, hypertension, leukopenia, neutropenia, nausea, lower respiratory tract infections and thrombocytopenia.
Copanlisib can cause harm to unborn babies. Patients with reproductive potential are thus advised to use effective contraception. Lactating patients are advised to not breastfeed.

Mechanism of action
Copanlisib is an inhibitor of phosphatidylinositol-3-kinase (PI3K) with inhibitory activity predominantly against PI3K-α and PI3K-δ isoforms expressed in malignant B-cells. It has been shown to induce tumor cell death by apoptosis and inhibition of proliferation of primary malignant B cell lines.

Regulatory history

Follicular lymphoma
For follicular lymphoma, the FDA awarded copanlisib orphan drug status in February 2015 and fast track designation in February 2016. The NDA for follicular lymphoma was granted priority review in May 2017.

In September 2017, it received accelerated approval (FDA regulation 21 CFR Part 314 subpart H) for the treatment of adult patients experiencing relapsed follicular lymphoma who have received at least two prior systemic therapies. Further clinical trials are to be performed as a post-marketing requirement to verify the clinical benefit.

Other
Copanlisib was granted orphan drug status for the treatment of splenic, nodal and extranodal subtypes of marginal zone lymphoma.

Clinical trials
Phase II clinical trials are in progress for treatment of endometrial cancer, diffuse large B-cell lymphoma, cholangiocarcinoma, and non-Hodgkin lymphoma. Copanlisib in combination with R-CHOP or R-B (rituximab and bendamustine) is in a phase III trial for relapsed indolent non-Hodgkin lymphoma (NHL). Two separate phase III trials are investigating the use of copanlisib in combination with rituximab for indolent NHL and the other using copanlisib alone in cases of rituximab-refractory indolent NHL.

In a preclinical study, copanlisib was effective in inhibiting HER2+ breast cancer cells with acquired resistance to the HER2-inhibitors trastuzumab and/or lapatinib. This effect was increased when copanlisib was administered along with the aforementioned HER2-inhibitors. Consequently, treatments of copanlisib with trastuzumab are being clinically trialled in HER2-positive breast cancer patients.

References 

Antineoplastic drugs
Phosphoinositide 3-kinase inhibitors
4-Morpholinyl compunds
Bayer brands
Pyrimidines